Christos Tsaganeas (2 July 1906 – 2 July 1976) was a Greek actor and a cinematographer.

Biography
Tsaganeas was born in Brăila, Romania. He starred in several movies, his most famous role being the college headmaster in To xylo vgike ap' ton paradeiso. His first important role was in The Germans are Coming with Vassilis Logothetidis where he says the well known phrase Anthropoi, anthropoi. Aimostageis, aimodipseis kai aimovoroi. Pros ti to missos ke o allilosparagmos. He married, secondly, to Nitsa Tsaganea. He died on his 70th birthday and was buried in the First Cemetery. His wife and their daughter were later buried alongside him.

Filmography

External links
 

1906 births
1976 deaths
Male actors from Athens
Greek male film actors
National Liberation Front (Greece) members
Romanian emigrants to Greece
People from Brăila
Film people from Athens
Recipients of the Order of George I
Burials in Athens
20th-century Greek male actors